St. Joseph County Infirmary, also known as Portage Manor, is a historic sanitarium located at South Bend, St. Joseph County, Indiana.  The main building was built in 1906, and is a two-story, Classical Revival style red brick building with two wings.  It features a two-story pedimented portico supported by four Ionic order columns.  Also on the property is a contributing brick smokehouse.  It was originally constructed as a county home for the elderly and incapacitated indigent.

It was listed on the National Register of Historic Places in 2000.

References

External links
Portage Manor website

Hospital buildings on the National Register of Historic Places in Indiana
Neoclassical architecture in Indiana
Hospital buildings completed in 1906
Buildings and structures in South Bend, Indiana
National Register of Historic Places in St. Joseph County, Indiana
1906 establishments in Indiana
Hospitals established in 1906